The Free Port Act was passed in 1766 following the Seven Years’ War and prior to the American Revolution. The Act opened six British ports in the West Indies to foreign merchants, and enabled English colonists to conduct trade with French and Spanish colonies. The Free Port act was a modified system in use by the French and Dutch.

Background 
Prior to 1766, the Navigation Acts of 1651 and 1660 tightly regulated British trade, restricting colonial trade to England and limiting foreign imports to promote the self-sufficiency of the British Empire.

However, as English colonists continued to settle in the Americas, the British West Indies became unable to produce sufficient quantities of certain commodities needed in other parts of the Atlantic. This included commodities such as sugar, raw cotton, and molasses. To solve for the lack of these commodities, the Free Port Act would enable foreign supplies to enter the British system. Four ports would open in Jamaica, while two ports would open in Dominica.

References

Acts of the Parliament of the United Kingdom